Margit Sandemo (née Underdal, 23 April 1924 – 1 September 2018) was a Norwegian-Swedish historical fantasy author. She had been the best-selling author in the Nordic countries since the 1980s, when her novel series of 47 books, The Legend of the Ice People, was published. She also wrote many other book series such as Häxmästaren and Legenden om Ljusets rike.

Typical features for works of Margit Sandemo are among other things history, fantasy, romance, suspense and supernatural phenomena. The plots of her books are often very complex and meandering, and continue from one book to another. In the central role are distinct amulets, old writings and symbols, which the main characters decipher in order to solve riddles stage by time, while fighting against evil powers. The events of the majority of her novels take place in Europe in the Middle Ages and in the beginning of Modern Times, especially in Norway and Iceland. Sometimes the main characters have adventures further away, such as in Spain and Austria. Medieval knight castles, bewitched forests and old-fashioned, idyllic manor milieu are among the settings the stories take place in.

Among her literary role models, Sandemo named William Shakespeare, Fyodor Dostoevsky, J.R.R. Tolkien, Agatha Christie and Kjersti Scheen. She read the whole of works of Shakespeare at the age of eight years, and wasn't much older when she turned to crime novels. Kalevala, the national epic of the Finnish people, Winnie the Pooh by A. A. Milne and King Lear were her favourites. In the adult age she has read significantly less, fearing subconscious plagiarizing. She says that she has got artistic influences also from the Kalevala motifed paintings of Akseli Gallen-Kallela and goblin motifed paintings of Gerhard Munthe. Other sources of inspiration have been classical music, such as the compositions of Johann Sebastian Bach and Ludwig van Beethoven as well as old Europeans folk stories. Besides these she is fond of Star Wars films, thriller film The Silence of the Lambs directed by Jonathan Demme and earliest episodes of TV-series The X-Files. To her mind the newest episodes of the series are pure rubbish.

Life

Childhood and youth
Margit Sandemo was born 23 April 1924 in a farm in Lena, Østre Toten, Valdres, Norway. Her father was a Norwegian poet, Anders Underdal, born in Valdres in 1880, and died in 1973. Underdal was born out of wedlock, and according to Sandemo herself, after an alleged affair between the Nobel Prize–winning Norwegian author Bjørnstjerne Bjørnson (1832–1910) and a 17-year-old croft girl named Guri Andersdotter (d. 1949). Audun Thorsen has written a book contradicting this allegation, entitled Bjørnsons kvinne og Margit Sandemos "familiehemmelighet" (in English: "Bjørnson's Woman and the "Family Secret" of Margit Sandemo") (Genesis forlag, Oslo, 1999), which the author herself hasn't read, because she thinks "that it would be too great of a shock for her".

During her childhood it was thought that the alleged unmarried affair with Bjørnstjerne Bjørnson must be kept secret. Even Anders Underdal, who early on gave an account of his origin to his children, fell silent about that matter later in life. Nobody knows why. Sandemo herself doesn't like talking about her ancestry in public.
Sandemo's mother was a Swedish noblewoman, Elsa Reuterskiöld (1892 – 1967), Elsa was a teacher, born in Blekinge as the 4th eldest of nine children of the county chief Axel Gabriel Adam Reuterskiöld (1863 – 1938) and Finnish-Swedish countess Eva Beata Gabriella Oxenstierna (1864 – 1949) from Korsholm and Wasa. As a Social Democrat Elsa Reuterskiöld took an active part in politics. According to her own claims, Sandemo on her mother's side was a descendant of numerous European noble families, and over 800 kings and 112 emperors were counted among her ancestors. Her earliest ancestors have been traced as far back as year 350 BC.

Elsa Reuterskiöld met Anders Underdal the first time in her summer holiday journey in a valley in Valdres. They married quite soon after that on 15 June 1921 and Underdal bought a small farm, located in Huldrehaugen, Grunke, Moen, close by Fagernes.
There the couple had five children, Margit being the second eldest. Her older sister was named Eva and her younger brothers, from the oldest to the youngest were: Axel, Anders and Embrik. There is only a seven-year age gap between the eldest and the youngest. One of brothers, Anders, committed suicide in the 1950s at the age of 29. Reuterskiöld and Underdal divorced in 1930, because her mother thinking her down-to-nature husband ways of life were unsuitable for a noble woman like her. When she moved back to Sweden, she brought her five children along.

Margit Sandemo never had a good relationship with her father. He was a strict man, punishing his children by locking them in a closet. During the German occupation of Norway in World War II he supported the Nazis openly - a thing Margit never could forgive him for.  When he was absent from home, his children would dream about his death.  His obituary read:  "Thank you God, why did you not let this happen sooner.."  Margit Sandemo tried to interact with her father as little as possible, that way she didn't have to speak bad about him afterwards.

Without any permanent address, the family had to spend irregular vagrancy life living in the corners of their relatives manors in various parts of Sweden. This was in Margit Sandemo's opinion somewhat humiliating. During her time in Sweden, she missed her birthplace in Valdres, Norway, which she still considered her true national place. Also her mother's occupation as a teacher may have been one of the reasons for moving so often. Margit took her compulsory education in a nine-year girl school, after which she studied in various night schools, as in an art school and was as an auditor in Dramaten. She got good grades, the best for behaviour, even though she took never schooling seriously. Sandemo had a gift for arts as a child. She was skilled at painting, singing, playing and poetry, making her mother very proud. However, she did not have any dreams to become a novelist. Margit spent her childhood summer at the estate of her grandparents in Blekinge.

Margit lived a happy childhood until the age of seven, when she fell victim to rape. This was the first of three and perhaps the mildest one. She was an adventurous tomboy, who was pleased to do long rambles far away from home. She often took the family dog the long walks, but unfortunately it never accompanied her the times she fell victim to violations. The second rape occurred when she was nine years old and was exceptionally brutal. The rapists used the handle of an axe during the rape, thus causing lifelong injury to her. In other words, damaged her urethra, and after this she has to "trot to a water closet" every half an hour. The rape was performed by three (to her) unknown men in the ages 40 – 60 years old. Margit hid this terrible thing from everyone, including her own mother, until, at the age of 60, she took a close friend into confidence. Sandemo has dealt with these events in the 38th volume of the novel series Sagan om Isfolket, Små män kastar långa skuggor (in English: Small Men Throw Long Shadows). This time from a character's point of view. In October 2004, she stated in an interview given to Swedish newspaper Aftonbladet that she killed her third rapist. He was a wandering peddler, to whom she fell victim at the age of twelve.  In her own words, she killed this man by throwing a big rock at his head and rolled the dead body into a ditch and covered it. The third rape revived the memories of both previous rapes and she flew into a fit of rage.

After she finished her autobiography Livsglede in the beginning of 2010, Margit Sandemos sister, Eva Underdal, told her she was actually raped a fourth time.  Margit had come home late one evening in the age of nine, pale as a sheet, with knees covered in scratches. She must have rejected the memory of this event later as she has no memory of it. These tragic and violent experiences led to her attempted suicide at the age of 17, using sleeping pills. Three days later however, she was as healthy as before.

In 1945, Margit met her future husband Asbjørn Sandemo (1917–1999) during the haymaking in the West Mountains of Vestre Slidre in Valdres. Asbjørn, a son of Ludvig Andersen (1879–1972) and Hulda Karlsson (1889–1956) came from Idd in Baleen and was a plumber by trade and a WWII veteran. By now, Margit's mother, Elsa Reuterskiöld, had ended her wandering life style and settled down in Valsberga in Södermanland.  Asbjörn and Margit first moved here also, mostly because they didn't have anywhere else to go. They married on 29 March 1946 in Strängnäs. There was seven children, but only three lived;  four others were born dead or miscarried. The three children are Henrik (b. 24 December 1945), Tove (b. 1949) and Bjørn (b. 1950). The family moved back to Huldrehaugen in Valdres in 1964. Now Margit Sandemo has seven grandchildren and five greatgrandchildren (2009). Eldest grandchild was born in 1969.

While Margit chose her professional career, she knew only that it should be artistic. She tried painting, tree-cutting, textile art, sculpture, folk singing and acting in a play by Ingmar Bergman. She also tried office work for two months. Once she tried stone-cutting, but it blocked their sewer system up and they were forced to blow it out with dynamite? She was never happy with any of these other professions anyway.

Literary career
Margit wrote her debut novel Tre Friare ("Three Suitors") at the age of forty. At that time, she had no experience in writing; however, she had already outlined thirty of the following novels in her mind. She has said that being a novelist is something you are born to do, rather than become. Tre Friare was rejected from different publishers more than hundred times, until the publisher of Ernst G. Mortensen in Oslo decided to serialize it in a magazine. Sandemo, who wished it to be published in book form, first couldn't accept this, but soon calmed down.  Whole series of serial novels 
followed the debut work. Margit wrote her thirty first novels at Siesta Café Konditori, the railway coffee bar in Fagernes. She is still in the habit of drafting her novels first there. Later all serial novels by her were published as a forty-volume series of novels called Margit Sandemos bästa följetonger (The Best Serial Novels by Margit Sandemo).

Her books, which weave supernatural themes with historical facts, have made her well-loved throughout Nordic countries and beyond. Her books can be read in Danish, Finnish, German, Hungarian, Icelandic, Norwegian, Polish and Swedish. In early 2007, it was revealed that her series Isfolket would be published in English for the first time.

She has written some stand-alone books, but her main claims to fame are her series. Of her extensive series, Sagan om Isfolket is perhaps what she is best known for.  It comprises 47 books, which follow a family for generations from the 16th century until present day as they battle a terrible curse.

Legend of the Ice People
In 1980, a publisher, "Bladkompaniet", suggested that Margit Sandemo write a series of historical novels. She initially wasn't excited about the idea, and decided to continue writing novel series for magazines, but, in her own words, changed her mind in 1981 when she saw a picture of a medieval church painting in a newspaper. It showed a woman making butter in a butter churn and the Devil behind her, trying to seduce her. Sandemo got the idea for the entire 47 book series The Legend of the Ice People from this picture, although in the beginning she  thought that the series would comprise only eight books. The first volume, Spellbound, was published in 1982.

Books published in English
Spellbound by Margit Sandemo (the first book in the Sagan om Isfolket series, translated as The Legend of the Ice People) was published in English in the UK by The Tagman Press on 30 June 2008. Sandemo came to London to promote its publication.  Five additional books from the series were also published in 2008.

Official website
The Margit Sandemo Official Website was launched in 2008. It contains news and information about the publication of her books in the UK. Other features include an English language forum and "Messages from Margit", updated by the author herself.
The English publications of the books by the Tagman Press continue to sell well, the website is no longer updated. Unofficial fan sites exist as well.

References

1924 births
2018 deaths
People from Østre Toten
Norwegian writers
Swedish fantasy writers
Swedish people of Norwegian descent
Writers of historical fiction set in the Middle Ages
Writers of historical fiction set in the early modern period
Swedish women writers
Women science fiction and fantasy writers
Women historical novelists
Norwegian emigrants to Sweden